Valentyn Ostapovych Rechmedin (12 February 1916 – 6 June 1986) was a Ukrainian journalist and writer.

He grew up in the village of Andrushivka in present Pohrebyshche Raion, Vinnytsia Oblast (province), where his father was a teacher.

After studies at Uman Cooperative Technicum (Уманський кооперативний технікум) he started his career as a journalist in 1934 at Molodyi Bilshovyk (Молодий Бiльшовик) in Vinnytsia. In 1939 he started to work at Vilna Ukraïna (Вільна Україна) and later at Leninska Molod (Ленінска Молодь) in Lviv.

Valentyn remained in Ukraine also after the German invasion of the Soviet Union in the summer of 1941. Later he became active in the Soviet partisan movement in the Vinnytsia area. In his partisan group he edited its Partyzanska Pravda. After the war he was awarded the Order of the Red Star.

After World War II he moved to Kiev where he worked at the newspapers Radianska Ukraïna, Literaturna Ukraïna (as deputy chief editor) and Kultura i zhyttia (as chief editor) and the magazine Vitchyzna (as deputy chief editor from 1963).

Valentyn started to write novels after the war. The stories were often based on his own experiences during the war. He always wrote in the Ukrainian language, but several books have been translated into Russian.

Valentyn was also a well-known drama and literary critic.

In one of his literary critiques of Mykhailo Stelmakh published in May 1972, Rechmedin noted:  "The older generation sees itself in the heroes of Velyka ridnya, Krov lyudska - ne vodytsia, Pravda i Kryvda, Khlib i sil those who had their souls scarred with disaster, poverty, hard work and injustice.

Bibliography

1951  Na verkhovyni
1958  Koly zakypala krov
1960  Viter z berehiv iunosty
1960  Vidchynyv u svit ya dveri...
1961  Vesniani hrozy
1962  Tvii pobratym. Romantychna istoria.
1965  Khodimo zi mnoiu, synu!
1967  Divchyna v ternovomu vinku
1971  Vohon batkovykh ran
1974  Narodzhennia Afrodity
1975  Pora piznikh dorih
1979  Za vesnoiu vesna
1983  Navpereimy doli
1986  Vybrani tvory (Koly zakypala krov & Khodimo zi mnoiu, synu!)

References

1916 births
1989 deaths
People from Vinnytsia Oblast
People from Lipovetsky Uyezd
Communist Party of the Soviet Union members
Ukrainian writers
Ukrainian journalists
Ukrainian literary critics
Soviet newspaper editors
Soviet journalists
Soviet writers
20th-century Russian journalists
Soviet partisans in Ukraine
Recipients of the Order of the Red Star